Stanford Lapolean Samuels III (born February 23, 1999) is an American football cornerback for the Philadelphia Stars of the United States Football League (USFL). He played college football at Florida State.

Early life and high school
Samuels grew up in Hollywood, Florida and attended Charles W. Flanagan High School. As a senior, Samuels was named the Broward County Defensive Player of the Year and played in the 2016 Under Armour All-America Game. A consensus top-five cornerback in his recruiting class, Samuels committed to play college football at Florida State, his father's alma mater, over offers from Alabama, Michigan, and Georgia.

College career
Samuels enrolled early at Florida State to participate in spring practices. Samuels played in all 13 of Florida State's games as a true freshman, registering 27 tackles with a sack five passes defended and two interceptions. He moved to safety and started the final 11 games of his sophomore season, finishing the year with 58 tackles (one for a loss), four interceptions and four pass breakups. As a junior, he moved back to cornerback and started all 12 of the Seminoles' games and made 60 tackles (1.5 for loss), two interceptions and seven passes defended and was named honorable mention All-ACC. Following the end of the season Samuels announced he would forgo his senior year at Florida State in order to enter the 2020 NFL Draft.

Professional career

Green Bay Packers
Samuels signed with the Green Bay Packers as an undrafted free agent on April 29, 2020, shortly after the conclusion of the 2020 NFL Draft. He was waived on September 5, 2020, and was signed to the practice squad the following day. He was elevated to the active roster on November 5 and 14 for the team's weeks 9 and 10 games against the San Francisco 49ers and Jacksonville Jaguars, and reverted to the practice squad after each game. On January 25, 2021, Samuels signed a reserve/futures contract with the Packers. He was released on August 18, 2021.

Chicago Bears
On January 5, 2022, Samuels was signed to the Chicago Bears practice squad.

Las Vegas Raiders
On May 16, 2022, Samuels signed with the Las Vegas Raiders. He was released on July 11, 2022.

Philadelphia Stars
Samuels signed with the Philadelphia Stars of the USFL on November 17, 2022.

NFL career statistics

Personal life
Samuels' father, Stanford Samuels Jr., also played football at Florida State and professionally in the Canadian Football League.

References

External links

Florida State Seminoles bio

Living people
1999 births
Players of American football from Florida
American football cornerbacks
Florida State Seminoles football players
Sportspeople from Pembroke Pines, Florida
Green Bay Packers players
Chicago Bears players
Las Vegas Raiders players
Philadelphia Stars (2022) players